This is a list of football matches played by the South Korea national football team between 1960 and 1969.

Results by year

List of matches

1960

Source:

1961

Source:

1962

Source:

1963

Source:

1964

Source:

1965

Source:

1966

Source:

1967

Source:

1968

Source:

1969

Source:

See also
 South Korea national football team results
 South Korea national football team

References

External links

1960s in South Korean sport
1960